BAP Paita (DT-141) is the former-, a Landing Ship, Tank leased from the US Navy for five years on 7 August 1984; recommissioned 4 March 1985; leased later extended to 1994.

The Paita participated in joint military amphibious training exercises with the United States in 2002, the largest such training exercise ever held by Peru. She is no longer in service, as the unit is no longer listed under operational ships in the Peruvian navy web page. She was officially decommissioned in September 2012.

Footnotes

 Saunders, Stephen. Jane's Fighting Ships 2002–2003. Coulsdon, UK: Jane's Information Group, 2002. .

1953 ships
Terrebonne Parish-class tank landing ships of the Peruvian Navy
Ships built in Pascagoula, Mississippi